Oski the Bear (Oski) is the official mascot of the University of California, Berkeley ("Cal"), representing the California Golden Bears. Named after the Oski Yell, he made his debut at a freshman rally in the Greek Theatre on September 25, 1941. Prior to his debut, live bears were used as Cal mascots. 

Oski's name, design, and character were developed by William “Rocky” Rockwell, who was the first student to play the role, and Warrington Colescott, an editor of The Daily Californian and famed satirist. Since his debut, Oski's activities have been managed by the Oski Committee, which also appoints a new Oski whenever a replacement is required; Oski's identity is protected by the Committee, and wearers of the suit generally do not disclose their identity. To that end, there may be multiple members of the Committee who wear the suit, depending on their schedules.

References

External links 

Oski.com includes many photos of Oski.
Oski biography at Official Cal Athletic Site.
The original Oski discusses the mascot's origin.
Cal Songs from the Cal Marching Band website.

California Golden Bears
Pac-12 Conference mascots
Fictional bears
Bear mascots
Mascots introduced in 1941